The Bole–Alashankou Expressway, commonly referred to as the Bo'a Expressway and designated G3019, is an expressway under construction between Jinghe County and Alashankou in the Chinese autonomous region of Xinjiang. It will serve as a connection between Alashankou, which serves as a major border crossing between China and Kazakhstan known as the Alataw Pass, and the county-level city of Bole. The expressway is an auxiliary route of the G30 Lianyungang–Khorgas Expressway. 

Despite its name, the expressway begins just south of the county-level city of Bole, in Jinghe County, and terminates south of Alashankou, at an interchange with the future G3018 Jinghe–Alashankou Expressway, near the present-day Bole railway station on the Northern Xinjiang railway. The G3018 Jinghe–Alashankou Expressway will continue northward to Alashankou. The expressway will be  in length and is expected to open by the end of 2018.

References

Chinese national-level expressways
Expressways in Xinjiang